India competed at the 2016 Asian Para Athletics Championships from March 6 to March 12 in Dubai, United Arab Emirates.

Results

Men

Track Events

Field Events

Women

Field Events 

IPC Athletics Asia-Oceania Championship 2016
2016 in Indian sport